Steven Bosch (born 6 June 1978) is a South African artist (working primarily in the medium of photography, video and ceramics) and creative consultant in Johannesburg. He was also a trend analyst and presenter on the Afrikaans TV program Sieners  on ViaTV, a South African lifestyle channel.

Biography 

Steven Bosch was born in Johannesburg and grew up in Florida on the West Rand. Bosch completed a B. Business Communication degree at the Potchefstroom University in 2001 and a Masters in Development Communication at the NWU in 2009. From 2004 to 2014 he lectured communications at the NWU in Potchefstroom. He is currently living in Johannesburg.

As an artist, Bosch has participated in several national group exhibitions since 2007. He has artworks in national public art collections, such as the NWU Art Collection as well as private collections locally and abroad.

He received an institutional award for creative excellence from the NWU in 2010 for his Solo exhibition, Stasis 

Bosch was a top 6 winner in the SA Taxi Foundation Art awards 2016.

Solo exhibitions

2010 	Stasis, Snowflake building, Aardklop National Arts Festival, Potchefstroom.

Selected group exhibitions 

2019 Oh Mercy: Bob Dylan, Artbox Gallery, Pretoria; Art.Well Gallery, Johannesburg.
2019 The Cat Show, David Krut Gallery, Rosebank Johannesburg.
2017 I am Free, Saheti, Johannesburg. (Exhibition in celebration of George Bizos' 90th birthday and in aid of George Bizos Saheti Scholarship and Bursary Fund)
2016 	       SA Taxi Foundation Art Awards finalist exhibition, Lizamore & Associates, Johannesburg.
2016	Lords of Winter, Equus Gallery, Cavalli Estate, Stellenbosch.
2015	The Games People Play, Aardklop, Botanical Gardens Gallery, NWU. Potchefstroom. 
2015		Letters to the Past or the Future, Trent Gallery, Pretoria. 
2014		Showcase 3, Bayliss Gallery, Norwood, Johannesburg.
2014		Salon 1, Upstairs at Bamboo, Melville, Johannesburg.
2013	Interruptions, University of Johannesburg Art Gallery, Aucklandpark, Johannesburg. (Exhibition in aid of George Bizos Saheti Scholarship and Bursary Fund).
2013		Five Photographers, Dawid’s Choice Gallery, Sandown Estate, Sandton.
2013 	       Absa L'Atelier finalist exhibition, Absa Towers, Johannesburg.
2013  	       Tom Waits for no man, ABSA KKNK, Oudtshoorn; UJ art gallery; Grande Provence, Franschoek. 
2013	Reflective Conversations, Die Gallery, North-West, University, Potchefstroom.
2012  	       Dismotief, Potchefstroom City Hall, Aardklop National Arts Festival.
2012  	       SASOL New Signatures, Pretoria Art Museum, Pretoria.
2012  	       Outsider, The Media Mill, Johannesburg.
2010 	       Absa L'Atelier finalist exhibition, Absa Towers, Johannesburg.
2010 	       L'origine du monde, Snowflake Building, Aardklop National Arts Festival, Potchefstroom.
2010 	       Transgressions and the boundaries of the page / Oor die einders van die bladsy, Africana-Room of the University of Stellenbosch’s Gericke Library, Woordfees, Stellenbosch; Die Gallery, North-West, University, Potchefstroom, and FADA Gallery, University of Johannesburg, Johannesburg.
2009		SASOL New Signatures, Pretoria Art Museum, Pretoria.
2009	        STREEK, Potchefstroom Museum, Aardklop  National Arts Festival, Potchefstroom.
2008		SASOL New Signatures, Pretoria Art Museum, Pretoria.
2008	        STREEK, Potchefstroom Museum, Aardklop  National Arts Festival, Potchefstroom.
2007	        STREEK, Potchefstroom Museum, Aardklop  National Arts Festival, Potchefstroom.

Exhibitions curated 

2012  	       Dismotief, Potchefstroom City Hall, Aardklop National Arts Festival

References

External links 
Artist's personal website

1978 births
Living people
South African photographers
North-West University alumni
South African contemporary artists